Małoszyce may refer to the following places:
Małoszyce, Łódź Voivodeship (central Poland)
Małoszyce, Silesian Voivodeship (south Poland)
Małoszyce, Świętokrzyskie Voivodeship (south-central Poland)
Małoszyce, Pomeranian Voivodeship (north Poland)